Miskinli (also, Misginli and Miskinlyu) is a village in the Shamkir Rayon of Azerbaijan.  The village forms part of the municipality of Muxtariyyət.

References 

Populated places in Shamkir District